Scott Liam Malone (born 25 March 1991) is an English professional footballer who plays as a left back or left-sided midfielder for Championship club Millwall.

Malone came through Wolverhampton Wanderers' academy to turn professional in 2009. Although he never played a first team match for the club, he had a series of loan moves while a Wolves player, culminating in a move to Bournemouth that became a permanent transfer in January 2012. Malone signed for Millwall in May 2012.

Club career

Wolves
Born in Rowley Regis, England, Malone is a product of Wolves' academy, having joined the club at the age of nine, and signed a professional contract with the club in February 2009, aged 18. He immediately departed for a spell on loan at Hungarian club Újpest, a partner club of Wolves, and made his Újpest debut, in a 2–0 win over Siófok on 7 March 2009. Malone then scored his first Újpest goal on 24 April 2009, in a 3–0 win over Budapest Honvéd. Malone went on to make eight appearances, scoring once, and helped them qualify for the newly formed UEFA Europa League. During this season, he also won Wolves' Academy Player of the Season Award.

Malone joined League One club Southend United on loan on 24 November 2009. Malone made his Southend United debut on the same day, where he made his first start, in a 2–0 loss against Tranmere Rovers. Then on 12 December 2009, Malone provided an assist for Francis Laurent to score the first goal of the game against Hartlepool United as they went on to win 3–2. Malone established himself in the first team, playing in the left–back position. After extending his loan spell for another month, it was subsequently later extended until the end of the 2009–10 season. Despite suffering an injury, Malone made 17 appearances in total for the Shrimpers during a campaign that ended in relegation. After his loan spell at Southend United came to an end, Malone signed a one–year contract extension with the club.

On 22 October 2010, Malone went out on loan again, joining League Two club Burton Albion on a one–month deal. Malone made his Burton Albion debut, the next day, playing 90 minutes, in a 3–0 win over Bradford City. During the match, Malone made an impressive display, helping the club keep a clean sheet and almost scored, earning him a Man of the Match Award. Having made 11 appearances so far, Malone's loan spell with the club was extended until the end of the season. Despite suffering from injuries, Malone scored his first goal in English football on 30 April 2011 in a 1–1 draw against former club Southend United and went on to make 22 appearances. Malone was linked with a return to Burton Albion on loan ahead of the 2011–12 season, but this was ruled out by Manager Paul Peschisolido and Malone, himself. Although Malone signed a new contract, Wolves put a price tag on Malone of about £150K.

AFC Bournemouth

On 18 July 2011, Malone joined League One side AFC Bournemouth on an initial six-month loan deal. He made his Bournemouth debut, in the opening game of the season, in a 3–0 loss against Charlton Athletic. Malone then scored three goals in three games between 29 October 2011 and 12 November 2011 against Preston North End, Scunthorpe United and Gillingham in the first round of FA Cup. After losing his place in the left–back position to Warren Cummings, Malone was moved into an unfamiliar left–midfield role by manager Lee Bradbury.

After becoming a regular player for the Cherries, a permanent transfer was agreed on 23 December 2011, and, upon the re-opening of the transfer in January 2012, Malone formally signed a three-and-a half-year contract for an undisclosed fee, believed to be £150,000.

However, Malone suffered a hamstring injury that kept him out for between two and three weeks, but sidelined for a lot longer. Malone scored in his first game after signing for the club on a permanent basis and set up a goal for Matt Tubbs, in a 2–0 win over Exeter City on 7 February 2012. Malone scored two more goals, as the season progressed, against Stevenage and Huddersfield Town. Malone later finished the 2011–12 season, making thirty–two appearances and scoring five times.

Millwall

On 30 May 2012, Malone joined Millwall in a move that included former Cherries player Josh McQuoid returning to Bournemouth as part of a swap deal. But Malone left Bournemouth on a bad note when he made a comment that made a "section of Bournemouth supporters" upset. Upon joining the club, Malone was given a number 28 shirt ahead of the 2011–12 season.

Malone made his Millwall debut for the club, in the first round of League Cup, against Crawley Town and played the whole 120 minutes of the match, including extra time, but Millwall were eliminated after losing 5–2 in a penalty shoot–out. Malone made his league debut, in the opening game of the season, in a 2–0 loss against Blackpool and scored in the next game, in a 2–1 win over Peterborough United three days later on 21 August 2012. Howevever, Malone struggled to establish himself in the first team, as he spent most of the season on the substitute bench, as well as, his own injury concern. Malone finished his first season at Millwall, making 16 appearances and scoring once in all competitions.

In the 2013–14 season, Malone continued to be in the sidelined at the start of the season and made his first appearance of the season, playing as a left–back, in a 3–1 win over Blackpool on 17 September 2013. Two weeks after his making return, Malone scored his first Millwall goal, in a 2–0 win over Leeds United. During a 2–2 draw against Burnley on 2 November 2013, Malone suffered an injury that saw him substituted after just seven minutes and, after undergoing a scan, it was found that he did not have any damage to his ligament. After weeks on the sidelines, Malone made his return to the first team, in a 1–0 win over Barnsley on 23 November 2013. Malone continued to suffer from injury, as the season progressed. A week after making his return, Malone scored his third goal for the club, in a 2–1 win over Nottingham Forest on 5 April 2014. At the end of the 2013–14 Championship season Scott Malone came second in the club "Player of the Year" after a string of impressive performances, including a performance at QPR, in which he scored a 91st-minute equaliser in a 1–1 draw on 26 April 2014. This was later ranked number nine as the key moment of the 2013–14 campaign for Millwall. Despite this, Malone finished the 2013–14 season, making 33 appearances and scoring two times.

In the 2014–15 season, Malone continued to be a first team regular and scored his first goal of the season in a 2–1 win over Blackpool on 30 August 2014. However, Malone suffered his own injury concerns, from which he managed to recover and regain his first team place. Despite Millwall's struggles, Malone's performance attracted interest from Cardiff City, who had their bid from Millwall accepted.

Cardiff City
Malone signed a two and a half year deal with Championship rivals' Cardiff City on 8 January 2015. Malone was previously linked with a move to Bundesliga side Borussia Dortmund, who made a bid for him before going to Cardiff City.

Two days after signing for the club, Malone made his Cardiff City debut, where he made his first start, in a 1–0 win over Fulham. Malone then provided assist for Kenwyne Jones to score an opener, in a 1–1 draw against Sheffield Wednesday on 7 February 2015. However, Malone suffered injuries as the 2014–15 season progressed. Malone ended the half of the 2014–15 season with Cardiff City, making thirteen appearances.

In the 2015–16 season, Malone started well when he scored an equaliser against Queens Park Rangers in a 2–2 draw. His performance earned him the Man of the Match by the fans, due to "ran up and down the left flank like a midfielder". This was followed by his second in a 3–2 win away to Bolton Wanderers. Malone went on to establish himself in the left–back position and went on to make forty–one appearances and scoring twice, having missed five games, due to four on the substitute bench and one over illness.

With his contract expiring at the end of the 2015–16 season, Malone's future at Cardiff City was in doubt, especially with the new management of Paul Trollope. However, Malone was expected not to be included in the first team ahead of the 2016–17 season, due to the pre-season form of Declan John.

Fulham
On 19 July 2016, Malone joined Championship side Fulham on a two-year deal in a swap deal with Jazz Richards joining Cardiff.

Malone made his Fulham debut, in the opening game of the season, where he made his first start and played 85 minutes, in a 1–0 win over Newcastle United. Two weeks later, on 20 August 2016, Malone played against his former club, Cardiff City, in a 2–2 draw. Malone played a vital role for Fulham against Middlesbrough in the second round of EFL Cup when he provided a double assist, in a 2–1 win and after the match, Malone was voted Man of the Match by fans. Malone scored his first goal for Fulham in a 4–2 win against Barnsley on 15 October 2016. On 22 April 2017, Malone scored Fulham's equalising goal in an away game against eventual play-off winners Huddersfield Town, with Fulham coming back from 1–0 down to comfortably win 4–1.

Malone played in both legs of Fulham's Championship play-off semi-final against Reading, on 13 May and 16 May 2017 respectively, with Fulham losing 2–1 on aggregate.

Huddersfield Town
On 5 July 2017, Malone joined Premier League club Huddersfield Town for an undisclosed fee, signing a three-year deal with the club. He made his debut for the club in a 2–1 victory over Rotherham United in the English League Cup.

Derby County
On 8 August 2018, Malone returned to the Championship by signing for Derby County for an undisclosed fee, signing a three-year deal with the club. He scored his first goal for Derby against West Bromwich Albion on 24 October 2018. On 14 June 2021 it was announced that he would leave Derby at the end of the season, following the expiry of his contract.

International career
In late–August, Malone received his first call–up by England U19 and made his England U19 debut on 10 September 2009, in a 3–1 win over Russia U19 and went on to make six appearances for England U19.

In February 2011, Malone was called–up by England U20. However, Malone was forced to withdraw from the squad after suffering tonsillitis.

Career statistics

References

External links

1991 births
Living people
English footballers
Nemzeti Bajnokság I players
English Football League players
Premier League players
Wolverhampton Wanderers F.C. players
Southend United F.C. players
Burton Albion F.C. players
Újpest FC players
AFC Bournemouth players
Millwall F.C. players
Cardiff City F.C. players
Fulham F.C. players
Huddersfield Town A.F.C. players
Derby County F.C. players
Expatriate footballers in Hungary
England youth international footballers
People from Rowley Regis
Association football fullbacks